Lake Evangeline is located in Glacier National Park, in the U. S. state of Montana. Nearby mountains include Longfellow Peak and Paul Bunyans Cabin to the southwest. Lake Evangeline is named for Longfellow's poem, Evangeline, his most famous work in his lifetime.

See also
List of lakes in Flathead County, Montana (A-L)

References

Evangeline
Evangeline